Carson Wen Ka-shuen, BBS, JP is a Hong Kong businessman, lawyer and politician.

Education 
Wen received his B.A. from Columbia College, Columbia University in 1975, and received his B.A. and M.A. from Balliol College, Oxford, where he studied law and was Younger Prizeman in Law for 1976.

Career 
He was a three-term deputy to the National People's Congress elected in 1997. He was also a former chairman of the Hong Kong Progressive Alliance and vice chairman of the Democratic Alliance for the Betterment and Progress of Hong Kong, elected in 2009. After he left in 2011, he remained an advisor to the party.

He is an independent director of Phoenix New Media Ltd. He was appointed as a Justice of the Peace (JP) by the Government of Hong Kong in 2002. He is the Executive Council member of the Sustainable Business Network of the United Nations Economic and Social Commission for Asia and the Pacific (ESCAP).

In 2016, Wen retired from the law firm Jones Day. Wen is currently Chairman of Bank of Asia (BVI), a digital, cross-border bank based in the British Virgin Islands, and the first bank to be authorized in the BVI in two decades. In 2018, he launched Eurasia Continental Fintech in Astana International Financial Centre.

Awards 
In 2007, he was awarded the Bronze Bauhinia Star by the Government of Hong Kong for his contribution to economic ties between Hong Kong, Mainland China and the rest of the world.

References

External links
 

1953 births
Living people
Columbia College (New York) alumni
Alumni of the University of Oxford
Solicitors of Hong Kong
20th-century Chinese lawyers
21st-century Chinese lawyers
Hong Kong businesspeople
Hong Kong Progressive Alliance politicians
Democratic Alliance for the Betterment and Progress of Hong Kong politicians
Delegates to the 9th National People's Congress from Hong Kong
Delegates to the 10th National People's Congress from Hong Kong
Delegates to the 11th National People's Congress from Hong Kong
Members of the Selection Committee of Hong Kong
Members of the Election Committee of Hong Kong, 1998–2000
Members of the Election Committee of Hong Kong, 2000–2005
Members of the Election Committee of Hong Kong, 2007–2012
Members of the Election Committee of Hong Kong, 2012–2017
Hong Kong Affairs Advisors
Hong Kong Affairs Society politicians
Recipients of the Bronze Bauhinia Star

zh:溫嘉旋